Baharlu (also Bagarlu) is a village in Syunik Province, Armenia.

See also 
Syunik Province

References

Populated places in Syunik Province